Abu Talib Muhammad ibn Ali al-Makki (died 386 AH/996 AD in Baghdad), was a hadith scholar, Shafi'i jurist, and Sufi mystic.

Biography
He was born in the Abbasid province of Jibal in the early 3rd AH / 9th AD centuries. 
Al-Makki grew up in Mecca, where he was educated in hadith and the Qur’an by the city's traditionalist circles. Abu Sa’id ibn al-Arabi (d. 341 AH/952-3 AD), a student of the sober Sufi Mystic, Junayd of Baghdad, was one of Al-Makki's early traditionalist teachers.
Al-Makki moved to Basra in 341 AH, and continued his studies alongside various Sufis before seeking permanent refuge in Baghdad. Al-Makki remained an intense ascetic throughout his life, and was known in Baghdad for his strict dietary regimens. From an early age Makki was weary of “personal judgment and analogical reasoning,” and favored using weak hadith literature to support his interpretations of sacred texts when strong hadith failed. He had a son, Umar Ibn Muhammad ibn ‘Ali (d. 444/ 1053).

The Sustenance of Hearts
Al-Makki's most influential work, "Qut al-qulub fi mu'amalat al-mahbub wa wasf tariq al-murid ila maqam al-tawhid" , or “The Sustenance of Hearts,” is a systematic exploration of Sufism and the ‘knowledge of hearts’. This knowledge, known as Ma'rifa, is accessible through inward and outward deeds of devotion to God. Al-Makki uses his intimate knowledge of hadith and the Qur'an to argue that Ma'rifa is the only true form of knowledge available to Muslims. In “The Sustenance of Hearts,” he interprets the Prophet's saying, “The quest for knowledge is a duty,” through the five pillars of Islam, as a divine assertion that the sciences of the heart have transcendent value. He outlines at length the elements of a wholly pious life- one informed by the sciences of the heart- and disparages the ‘knowledge of tongues.’ This refers to any form of knowledge that can be used for social and economic benefit. Al-Makki's focused attack on this form of knowledge was likely influenced by the careerism of religious specialities that accompanied Islam's expansion. In part because of his feelings towards the ‘knowledge of tongues’,  Al-Makki has been compared to the early renunciants and People of The Blame. These severe ascetics disdained similarly selfish and innovative practitioners of Islam.
Al-Ghazali used this book as a source for some of the chapters of his magnum opus Ihya' 'Ulum al-Din (The Revival of the Religious Sciences).

References 

 Massignon, Louis. Encyclopedia of Islam (Second Edition). ed. Kramers, J. H., Gibb, H. A. R., et al. Leiden, 1954, Vol. 1 p. 153.
Böwering, Gerhard. The Mystical Vision of Existence in Classical Islam: The Qur'anic Hermeneutics of the Şufi Sahl al-Tustari (d. 283/896). Berlin and New York, 1980, pp. 25–7.
Qut al-qulub fi mu'amalat al-mahbub wa wasf tariq al-murid ila maqam al-tawhid (The nourishment of hearts in dealing with the Beloved and the description of the seeker's way to the station of declaring oneness). ed. Basil 'ayun al-sud, Dar al-kutub al-'ilmiyah, Beirut, 1997. 2vols.
Knowledge of God in Classical Sufism: Foundations of Islamic Mystical Theology, Paulist Press (2004), .

Sufi mystics
10th-century Arabic writers
996 deaths
Year of birth unknown
People from Mecca
10th-century jurists
Iranian Muslim mystics
10th-century Muslim scholars of Islam